is a passenger railway station located in the city of   Amagasaki Hyōgo Prefecture, Japan. It is operated by the private transportation company Hanshin Electric Railway. In the official indication, the punctuation after Naruo (鳴尾) is a centered dot.

Lines

Layout
The station consists of two opposed elevated side platforms serving two tracks. The ticket gate and concourse are on the 2nd floor, and the platforms are on the 3rd floor.

Platforms

History 

Naruo Station opened on 12 April 1905 along with the rest of the Hanshin Main Line.

Between 2009 and 2017, the station gradually moved from surface level to an elevated structure. The westbound tracks were elevated in 2015 while the eastbound tracks were completed in 2017.

On 1 April 2014, station numbering with Naruo being designated as station number HS-13.

Gallery

Passenger statistics
In fiscal 2020, the station was used by an average of 12,510 passengers daily

Surrounding area
Mukogawa Women's University
Nishinomiya Municipal Nishinomiya Higashi High School
Hyogo Prefectural Naruo High School
Nishinomiya Municipal Gakubun Junior High School

See also
List of railway stations in Japan

References

External links

 Naruo - Mukogawajoshidai-Mae Station website 

Railway stations in Japan opened in 1905
Railway stations in Hyōgo Prefecture
Hanshin Main Line
Nishinomiya